Neil Wagner (born 13 March 1986) is a South African-born New Zealand Test cricketer who plays for New Zealand and Northern Districts cricket teams. He played for Northerns until 2007/08 and Otago between 2008 and 2018.

Early career
Wagner was born at Pretoria and attended Afrikaanse Hoër Seunskool as a high school student where he played for the 1st team. He is a left-handed batsman and left-arm medium-fast bowler who toured Zimbabwe and Bangladesh with South African Academy sides and was twelfth man in two Test matches for South Africa. In 2008, he moved to New Zealand to pursue a career playing Test cricket. In June 2009, he was awarded a place in the New Zealand Emerging Players team under Peter Fulton, and eventually made his test debut for New Zealand against the West Indies in 2012. He has since played in 59 Test matches for New Zealand.

World record 
On 6 April 2011, Wagner took four wickets in four balls against Wellington when he dismissed Stewart Rhodes, Joe Austin-Smellie, Jeetan Patel and Ili Tugaga. He then took the wicket of Mark Gillespie with the sixth ball of the same over: five wickets in one 6-ball over, the first (and, so far, only) time this has been achieved in first-class cricket. His bowling figures for the innings were 6/36, his personal best at that time.

International career
Born to South African parents although he has Kiwi heritage through his grandmother,

After an uneven start to his test career against the West Indies and his birth country South Africa, Wagner established himself as a reliable 3rd seamer for New Zealand side during their 2013 home and away series against England, taking 19 wickets in 5 tests. Wagner produced consistent performances over the next 2 years (including a man of the match 8 wicket haul against India at Eden Park). Despite this, he struggled to maintain his place in the side and was not selected in either of New Zealand's 2 tests against England in 2015.

Wagner returned to the side during Sri Lanka's tour for New Zealand in late 2015. He produced a series of strong performances, as New Zealand comfortably won the series. Skipper Brendon McCullum described Wagner before the Test as his "workhorse".

The performances earned him another call-up for the second test against Australia. Wagner bowled well, taking 7 wickets including 6 wickets in the first innings. Since then, Wagner has become a regular starter in the New Zealand test side.

Wagner continued his fine form during New Zealand's tour of Zimbabwe in 2016, where he won the player of the series award. He took 11 wickets in the two match series, including a five wicket haul in the first test. New Zealand then toured Wagner's homeland of South Africa. In the second Test, while New Zealand were soundly beaten Wagner again led the attack, taking his fourth five wicket bag.

In April 2017, he was named in New Zealand's One Day International (ODI) squad for the 2017 Ireland Tri-Nation Series.

On 1 December 2017, Wagner became the opening partner to Trent Boult as Tim Southee was injured, and claimed his best figures of 7/39, which is also a New Zealand record to claim 7/39 within a day, and within two sessions of play.

In May 2018, he was one of twenty players to be awarded a new contract for the 2018–19 season by New Zealand Cricket. In November 2018, in the second match against Pakistan, he took his 150th Test wicket. In December 2019, in the second Test against Australia, Wagner took his 200th Test wicket, and finished the 2019/20 home season ranked as the number 2 test bowler in the ICC's world rankings.

In December 2020, in the second match against the West Indies, Wagner played in his 50th Test match.

In May 2021, Wagner was named in New Zealand's squad for the Test series against England and the World Test Championship final against India. He played in all three Tests, finishing the tour with 10 wickets, including three in New Zealand's victory in the World Test Championship.

References

External links
 
 

1986 births
Northerns cricketers
Northamptonshire cricketers
Northern Districts cricketers
Otago cricketers
Cricketers from Pretoria
Living people
New Zealand Test cricketers
New Zealand expatriate sportspeople in England
Lancashire cricketers
Essex cricketers
South African emigrants to New Zealand
Naturalised citizens of New Zealand
New Zealand cricketers
South African cricketers
South African expatriate sportspeople in New Zealand